is a Japanese actor, supermodel, guitarist and break dancer. He gained popularity as Naoki Irie in the 2013 television series Mischievous Kiss: Love in Tokyo and its sequel, Mischievous Kiss 2: Love in Okinawa.

Personal life
Furukawa was born on December 18, 1987 in Tokyo. He and his family moved to Canada when he was seven years old. He moved to the United States at the age of 16 during his high school years and returned to Japan to study Engineering at Keio University. In June 2019, he announced that he got married and was expecting his first child. Furukawa and his wife announced the birth of their first child, a baby girl, via Twitter.

Career
Furukawa is known for his 2013 breakthrough role in the Japanese television drama Mischievous Kiss: Love in Tokyo in which he played the lead role Naoki Irie. He presented a new image of the classical manga role of Irie Naoki, and starred opposite Honoka Miki who played his love interest. Within two months of joining Weibo, the Chinese equivalent of Twitter, the number of his followers increased to more than 500,000. Due to his popularity in China, he starred in the Fuji TV/iQiyi web-drama Mysterious Summer which was the first drama series co-produced by Japan and China. The series was viewed more than 60 million times on Chinese online video platform iQiyi and was distributed online in more than 35 countries worldwide.

He is the first Japanese actor to have had a fan meeting in Shanghai, China on July 21, 2013.

Filmography

Drama

Film

Music Video

Awards

References

External links
 
 Official Horipro profile
 
 
 
 

1987 births
Living people
Japanese expatriates in Canada
Japanese expatriates in the United States
Japanese male actors
Keio University alumni
People from Tokyo
Breakdancers